The Association of Christian Schools International (ACSI), founded in 1978, is an association of evangelical Christian schools. Its headquarters are in Colorado Springs, Colorado.

History 
ACSI was founded in 1978 through the merger of three associations: The National Christian School Education Association; The Ohio Association of Christian Schools; and the Western Association of Christian Schools. Various international schools have joined the network. In 2023, it had 25,000  schools in 100 countries.

Governance 
The governance of the organization is ensured by a President and Regional Presidents in the 5 Continental Regions Members.

Affiliations 
The organization is a member of the World Evangelical Alliance.

Lawsuit

In spring 2006, the Association of Christian Schools International sued the University of California system alleging that the rejection of several Christian science courses was "viewpoint discrimination" which violated the constitutional rights of applicants from Christian schools whose high school coursework is deemed inadequate preparation for college. The lawsuit was brought by the parents of six children who had not been rejected from the university. In August 2006, the case Association of Christian Schools International v. Roman Stearns was allowed to proceed against the university while lawsuits against individual school officials were thrown out.

The National Center for Science Education noted, "One of the lawyers representing the plaintiffs is Wendell Bird, a former staff attorney for the Institute for Creation Research. As a special assistant attorney general for Louisiana, he defended the state's "equal time" law, which was ruled to be unconstitutional in Edwards v. Aguillard. The National Center for Science Education works in collaboration with National Academy of Sciences, the National Association of Biology Teachers and the National Science Teachers Association, which consider creationism and intelligent design to be pseudoscience.

The Association retained leading intelligent design proponent Michael Behe to testify in the case as an expert witness. Behe's expert witness report claimed that the Christian textbooks were excellent works for high school students and he defended that view in a deposition.

On March 28, 2008 the defendants won a legal victory when their motion for partial summary judgment was granted, and the plaintiffs' motion for summary judgment was denied. On August 8, 2008, Judge Otero entered summary judgment against plaintiff ACSI.

References

External links
 ACSI home page

Christian schools in the United States
Evangelical educational organizations
Educational accreditation
Evangelicalism in Colorado
Non-profit organizations based in Colorado
Private and independent school organizations in the United States
Organizations based in Colorado Springs, Colorado
Organizations established in 1978